The seventh season of Australian reality television series House Rules began airing on 28 April 2019.  The series is produced by the team who created the Seven reality show My Kitchen Rules. This is Johanna Griggs final season as host.

Season 7 was confirmed in June 2018 with applications for the seventh season of House Rules open between June and 7 September 2018 on the official Network Seven website. Season 7 was officially confirmed in October 2018, as well with the announcement of new judge, Jamie Durie, who replaces Drew Heath. Production for the series began in November 2018.

This season of House Rules consisted of new teams renovating each other's homes and further challenges for an ultimate prize of $250,000.

Format changes

Teams – This season includes six teams instead of seven teams like in the previous season.
Prize Money – Unlike the previous season, the prize money is already pre-determined. The prize for this season is $250,000.
Advantage – When a team has the highest score after a house renovation, they receive an advantage of 5 bonus points and $5000 for the next renovation; however, to get the advantage, they and another team (of their choice) have to reveal a room early, judged by the homeowners. The team with the best room receives the advantage.
House Evaluation – After each interior renovation and exterior renovation, a property expert from Century 21 valued each teams houses. They told the team the evaluation of the house before the renovation was complete and then give them a card with the new evaluation, after the completed renovation. 

Grand Final – For the first time in House Rules history, three teams will compete against each other in the Grand Final, unlike previous seasons where it had only ever been two teams.

Contestant Teams

Elimination history

Competition Details

Phase 1: Warehouse Apartment

 Episode 1 & 2
 Airdate — 28 & 29 April
 Description — In the first challenge, the teams had three days to renovate a room each in a warehouse apartment (which is above their new home base). The highest scoring team will receive an advantage for the first interior renovation.

Phase 2: Interior Renovation
The six teams traveled around the country to completely renovate each other's home. Every week, one team handed over their house to their opponents for a complete interior transformation. A set of rules from the owners were given to the teams known as the 'House Rules' which needed to be followed to gain high scores from the judges and the homeowner team.

Victoria: Pete & Courtney
 Episodes 3 to 6
 Airdate — 30 April to 6 May
 Description — Teams headed to Pete & Courtney’s home in Ferntree Gully, Victoria for the first renovation. One of the bedrooms belong to their one year old son, Casper
Previous winner's advantage: Lisa & Andy — 5 bonus points and  $5000 for their next renovation
Previous loser's disadvantage: Lisa & Andy — Camping in a tent during the renovation.

Notes
* Mikaela & Eliza first received the advantage, however had to compete against another team (Lisa & Andy) in early room reveal. Judged by the homeowners, they chose Lisa & Andy’s room, who received 5 bonus points

South Australia: Lisa & Andy
 Episodes 7 to 10
 Airdate — 7 to 13 May
 Description — Teams headed to Lisa & Andy’s home in Adelaide, South Australia for the second renovation. 
Previous winner's advantage: Katie & Alex — 5 bonus points and  $5000 for their next renovation
Previous loser's disadvantage: Shayn & Carly — Camping in a tent during the renovation.

Notes
* Katie & Alex first received the advantage, however had to compete against another team (Pete & Courtney) in early room reveal. Judged by the homeowners, they chose Katie & Alex’s room, who received 5 bonus points

Western Australia: Mikaela & Eliza
 Episodes 11 to 14
 Airdate — 14 to 20 May
 Description — Teams headed to Mikaela & Eliza’s home in Yallingup, Western Australia for the third renovation. The home belongs to their mum, Kristen.
Previous winner's advantage: Shayn & Carly  — 5 bonus points and  $5000 for their next renovation
Previous loser's disadvantage: Due to a unanimous vote Mikaela & Eliza have to stay in the tent next renovation as they came last in the renovation before their home.

Notes
* Katie & Alex first received the advantage, however had to compete against another team (Shayn & Carly) in early room reveal. Judged by the homeowners, they chose Shayn & Carly’s room, who received 5 bonus points

Victoria: Tim & Mat
 Episodes 15 to 18
 Airdate — 21 to 27 May
 Description — Teams headed to Tim & Mat’s home in Melbourne, Victoria for the fourth renovation. The home belongs to Tim and his wife Kate and their one year-old daughter, Isabella.
Previous winner's advantage: Lisa & Andy — 5 bonus points and  $5000 for their next renovation
Previous loser's disadvantage: Lisa & Andy and Mikaela & Eliza — Camping in a tent during the renovation. Due to a unanimous vote Mikaela & Eliza have to stay in the tent as they came last in the renovation before their home.

Notes
* Shayn & Carly first received the advantage, however had to compete against another team (Lisa & Andy) in early room reveal. Judged by the homeowners, they chose Lisa & Andy’s room, who received 5 bonus points

Queensland: Shayn & Carly
 Episodes 19 to 22
 Airdate — 28 May to 3 June
 Description — Teams headed to Shayn & Carly’s home in Aroona, Queensland for the fifth renovation. Two of the bedrooms belong to their daughters; Harper, five years old and Imogen, three years old.
Previous winner's advantage: Pete & Courtney — 5 bonus points and  $5000 for their next renovation
Previous loser's disadvantage: Katie & Alex — Camping in a tent during the renovation.

Notes
* Pete & Courtney first received the advantage, however had to compete against another team (Tim & Mat) in early room reveal. Judged by the homeowners, they chose Pete & Courtney’s room, who received 5 bonus points

New South Wales: Katie & Alex
 Episodes 23 to 26
 Airdate — 4 to 10 June
 Description — Teams headed to Katie & Alex’s home in Gundaroo, NSW for the sixth and final interior renovation. One of the bedrooms belong to their one year old daughter, Hallie. The lowest scoring team overall will be eliminated.
Previous winner's advantage: Tim & Mat — 5 bonus points and  $5000 for their next renovation
Previous loser's disadvantage: Mikaela & Eliza — Camping in a tent during the renovation.

Notes
* Tim & Mat first received the advantage, however had to compete against another team (Mikaela & Eliza) in early room reveal. Judged by the homeowners, they chose Tim & Mat’s room, who received 5 bonus points.

Phase 3

Give Back House
 Episodes 27 to 29
 Airdate — 16 to 23 June
 Description — The 5 remaining teams headed to Campbelltown, New South Wales, namely the home of Mary, Graeme and their four shared children, whose home caught fire due to a faulty appliance and burnt down. The teams will renovate the house from the framework remaining of the house. The lowest scoring team at the end of the round was eliminated.
Previous winner's advantage: Tim & Mat — Keep or swap their zone, Bonus Room & a personal driver

Notes

Phase 4: Gardens & Exteriors

The top 4 teams are challenged to transform the exteriors and gardens of each other's homes. Three teams are allocated to a home (that do not belong to them) and must renovate a zoned area in the gardens, as well as improving the house exterior. They are held over four rounds, covering all houses of the current teams. After the rounds are complete, the lowest scoring team is eliminated.

Round 1

 Episodes 30 to 32
 Airdate —  24 to 30 June
 Description — In round 1 of the exterior renovations, three of the remaining teams head to Lisa & Andy’s home in Adelaide, South Australia to transform the backyard and house exterior in 4 Days. Teams are each allocated a zone in the gardens.
Golden Shovel winner's advantage: Tim & Mat — $5,000 & Fix Up Room

Notes

Round 2

 Episodes 33 to 35
 Airdate —  1 to 7 July
 Description — In round 2 of the exterior renovations, three of the remaining teams head to Tim & Mat’s home in Melbourne, Victoria to transform the front & backyard and house exterior in 4 Days. Teams are each allocated a zone in the gardens.
Golden Shovel winner's advantage: Pete & Courtney — $5,000 & Fix Up Room

Notes

Round 3

 Episodes 36 to 38
 Airdate —  8 to 14 July
 Description — In round 3 of the exterior renovations, three of the remaining teams head to Shayn & Carly’s home in Aroona, Queensland to transform house exterior in 4 Days. Teams are each allocated a zone in the gardens.
Golden Shovel winner's advantage: Lisa & Andy — $5,000 & Fix Up Room

Notes

Round 4

 Episodes 39 to 41
 Airdate —  15 to 21 July
 Description — In round 4 of the exterior renovations, three of the remaining teams head to Pete & Courtney’s home in Ferntree Gully, Victoria to transform house exterior in 4 Days. Teams are each allocated a zone in the gardens. The lowest scoring team overall will be eliminated.
Golden Shovel winner's advantage: Lisa & Andy — $5,000 & Fix Up Room

{| class="wikitable plainrowheaders" style="text-align:center; font-size:90%; width:65em;"
|+ Renovation summary
! colspan="8"  | Round 4
|-
! colspan=8 style="width:15%;"| House Rules
|-
! Rule 1
| colspan="8"| Make arriving an event
|-
! Rule 2
| colspan="8"| Design a ‘party central’ deck
|-
! Rule 3
| colspan="8"| ''Give every zone something 'extra|-
! Rule 4
| colspan="8"| Turn heartbreak hill into a native paradise
|-
! Rule 5
| colspan="8"| Choose your zone
|-style="border-top:3px solid #aaa;"
! rowspan="2"| Team
! rowspan="2" style="width:40%;"| Zone
! colspan="4" style="width:30%;"| Scores
! rowspan="2" style="width:15%;"| 
! rowspan="2" style="width:15%; border-left:3px solid #aaa;"| 
|-
! style="width:10%;"| Homeowners
! style="width:10%;"| Jamie
! style="width:10%;"| Laurence
! style="width:10%;"| Wendy
|-
| style="width:15%;"| 
| 
|  10||10||10||10
| 
| style="border-left:3px solid #aaa;" bgcolor="lightgreen"| 1st (104)|-
| style="width:15%;"| 
| colspan="6" 
| style="border-left:3px solid #aaa;"| 2nd (93)|-
| style="width:15%;"| 
| 
|  6||6||6||7
| 
| style="border-left:3px solid #aaa;"| 3rd (91)|-
| style="width:15%;"| 
| 
|  3||5||7||7
| 
| style="border-left:3px solid #aaa;" bgcolor="pink"| 4th (85)|-
|}

Notes

Grand Final

 Episode 42 & 43 Airdate — 22 & 23 July 
 Description''' — For the first time in House Rules history, 3 teams have 7 days to renovate a loft apartment. The team that receives the highest score won the season (thus becoming House Rules 2019 Champion) and received $250,000.

Ratings

 Colour key:
  – Highest number of viewers/nightly rank during the season
  – Lowest number of viewers/nightly rank during the season

Notes
Ratings data used is from OzTAM and represents the live and same day average viewership from the 5 largest Australian metropolitan centres (Sydney, Melbourne, Brisbane, Perth and Adelaide).

References

2019 Australian television seasons